Gandu is a municipality in the state of Bahia in the North-East region of Brazil. Gandu has its origin as Fazenda Corujão, a farm purchased in 1912 by José Amado Costa for the cultivation of cocoa. Corujão became a district of the municipality of Ituberá in 1958, and an independent municipality on July 18, 1962.

Notable people
Alejandro Aragao Da Cruz

References

Municipalities in Bahia